In physics, a neutral particle is a particle with no electric charge, such as a neutron. 

The term neutral particles should not be confused with truly neutral particles, the subclass of neutral particles that are also identical to their own antiparticles.

Stable or long-lived neutral particles
Long-lived neutral particles provide a challenge in the construction of particle detectors, because they do not interact electromagnetically, except possibly through their magnetic moments. This means that they do not leave tracks of ionized particles or curve in magnetic fields. Examples of such particles include photons, neutrons, and neutrinos.

Other neutral particles

Other neutral particles are very short-lived and decay before they could be detected even if they were charged. They have been observed only indirectly. They include:

 Z bosons
 Dozens of heavy neutral hadrons:

See also 
 Neutral particle oscillation
 Truly neutral particle

References 

 K. Nakamura et al. (Particle Data Group), JP G 37, 075021 (2010) and 2011 partial update for the 2012 edition

Particle physics